Georgy Alexeyevich Ushakov (17 (30) January 1901 – 3 December 1963) was a Soviet explorer of the Arctic.

Ushakov broke new ground when he surveyed and explored Severnaya Zemlya, together with four other Arctic explorers, establishing that it was an archipelago. He was honoured by being named Doctor of Geographic Sciences in 1950.

Career

In 1926, Ushakov founded the first Soviet settlement on Wrangel Island (today called Ushakovsky) and was its head for three years. In 1930–1932, Ushakov headed the Severnaya Zemlya expedition and established a polar station called Остров Домашний (Domashniy Island).

In 1929 and 1930 icebreaker Sedov carried groups of scientists to Franz Josef Land and later to former Emperor Nicholas II Land, the last major piece of unsurveyed territory in the Soviet Arctic. In 1926 the Presidium of the Central Executive Committee of the USSR had renamed the still not fully explored land Severnaya Zemlya  (Northern Land). This archipelago was completely mapped under Ushakov, together with geologist Nikolay Urvantsev, surveyor Sergei Zhuravlev and radio operator Vasily Khodov thoroughly surveyed Severnaya Zemlya during a 1930–1932 expedition to the archipelago. between 1930 and 1932. This voyage allowed to obliterate enormous "white spaces" on the Arctic map. Geographic features of the territory were named after communist organizations, events and personalities. About the bleakness of Severnaya Zemlya Ushakov wrote:

In 1935, Ushakov led the first Soviet high-latitude expedition on an icebreaker Sadko. The cruises of the Sadko went farther north than most; in 1935 and 1936 the last unexplored areas in the northern Kara Sea were examined and the little Ushakov Island was discovered. In 1937 the ship was caught in the ice with two others and forced to winter in the Laptev Sea, adding valuable winter observations to the usual summer ones.

In 1932–1936, Georgy Ushakov was employed at the Chief Directorate of the Northern Sea Route (Главное Управление Северного Морского Пути).
Ushakov then worked at the Chief Directorate of Hydrometeorological Service of the USSR (1936-1940) and Soviet Academy of Sciences (1940-1958).

Ushakov died in Moscow, but was buried on Domashniy Island in Severnaya Zemlya.

Honours
Mountains in the Antarctica, a spit and a cape on Wrangel Island, as well as a river on October Revolution Island bear Ushakov's name. But perhaps the greatest honor was that Ushakov Island, which was the last piece of undiscovered territory in the Russian Arctic, was named after him.

Medals
Ushakov was awarded the Order of Lenin, two other orders, and a number of medals.

References

External links
Role of Georgiy Alekseevich Ushakov in development of Russian oceanology
The Russian Arctic

1901 births
1963 deaths
Russian and Soviet polar explorers
Polar exploration by Russia and the Soviet Union
Russian explorers
Severnaya Zemlya
Kara Sea
Laptev Sea
Explorers of the Arctic
Recipients of the Order of Lenin
Soviet explorers